is a Japanese manga series written and illustrated by Banri Hidaka. It was originally serialized in Hana to Yume in 2001, with the individual chapters collected and published in seven tankōbon volumes by Hakusensha. The story focuses on Kei Hasumi, an anorexic teenager girl in love with her brother's friend Kakeru Suwa, who lost his memory. Kei searches for the ring he'd given his girlfriend to try to help him recover his memory. She is aided by Kyosuke Kanzaki, a classmate who is in love with her, who lives in an apartment where Kei believes the ring may be.

It is licensed for English language release in North America by CMX, which released the first volume in January 2008.

Media

Manga
Written and illustrated by Banri Hidaka, Tears of a Lamb premiered in the 19th issue of Hana to Yume in 2001, where it ran until its conclusion in the 23rd issue 2003. The forty-two unnamed chapters were collected and published in seven tankōbon by Hakusensha from April 2002 until March 2004. The series is licensed for English-language release in North America by CMX Manga, which released the first volume in January 2008.

Volume list

Drama CD
Two drama CDs from the series were released non-commercially for the series. The first was released with the 4th issue of Hana to Yume in 2004, as a promotional item which contained tracks for other series from the magazine as well. The second was available only via mail-in and contained a booklet with the character introduction and comments of the author regarding the characters. There is also a scenario booklet that contains the script of the tracks in the CD. Both CDs featured the voices of Yukari Tamura as Kei Hasumi and Kentarō Itō as Kyosuke Kanzaki.

Illustration collection
A joint illustrated collection of Banri Hidaka's 2 works, Sekai de Ichiban Daikirai and Tears of a Lamb was released on March 17, 2004.

Reception
Pop Culture Shock's Katherine Dacey criticises the manga, saying, "Comedic moments bump up against revelations of anorexia, broken homes, and broken engagements, making for a very choppy read. The few scenes in which characters break the fourth wall to crack jokes are especially distracting, coming on the heels of serious revelations about Hasumi’s mental health." Pop Culture Shock's Michelle Smith commends the manga for "Kanzaki’s consideration of Kei is shown through his actions rather than told in mere words. The best scenes are when they are engaged in heartfelt conversation" as well as its cute art, saying, "I love the fleecy lambs sprinkled throughout".  However, she criticises the manga for "the continual reliance on violence as a source of humor." In a review of volume one, Clara Yamasaka wrote in Newtype USA "Later volumes may bring more insight into the troubles that have damaged these two teens' psyches, but if you have real world troubles of your own, you might feel more like slapping these characters upside the head instead of reading subsequent volumes." Jason Thompson described the author's manga in general as being "basically romantic character sketches", noting that the major difference in Tears of a Lamb was that it started "disorientedly in the middle of things".  He found the problems faced by the characters seemed "merely gimmicky".

References

External links
 
 

2001 manga
Shōjo manga
Comedy anime and manga
Romance anime and manga
CMX (comics) titles
Hakusensha manga